50 metres hurdles is a distance in hurdling, usually only run in indoor competitions. Because very few contests are held over the distance, most of the fastest times recorded for the event were set during specially measured and timed races over longer distances, typically the 55 metres hurdles or 60 metres hurdles.

All-time top 25
Note: Indoor results only.
 + = Timed recorded by athlete en route to a longer distance
 A = affected by altitude

Men
Correct as of August 2018.

Notes
Below is a list of other times equal or superior to 6.39:

Greg Foster also ran 6.37 (1986).
Renaldo Nehemiah also ran 6.38 (1979).
Mark McKoy also ran 6.38 (1986), 6.39 (1995).
Tony Dees also ran 6.38 (1999).
Anier García also ran 6.39 (2000).

Women
Correct as of August 2018.

Notes
Below is a list of other times equal or superior to 6.73:

Cornelia Oschkenat also ran 6.60 (1988), 6.68 (1988), 6.69 (1989), 6.71 (1986, 1987), 6.73 (1986, 1987).
Gloria Siebert also ran 6.67 (1988), 6.69 (1988), 6.72 (1990).
Michelle Freeman also ran 6.69+ (2000), 6.72+ (2001).
Jackie Joyner-Kersee also ran 6.73 A (1996).

References

External links
IAAF list of 50-metres-hurdles records in XML

Events in track and field
Hurdling
Indoor track and field
Sprint hurdles